SpectSoft was a software development company started in 1997 to create tools for the professional film and video markets. They were located in Oakdale, Stanislaus County, California.

SpectSoft developed Linux based uncompressed recording, playback, processing systems that are designed to capture and play images and sound from digital cinematography cameras, decks, Telecine and other devices. Products support compressed and uncompressed SD, HD, 2K, 4K and beyond images in 2D or 3D.

Products

CanvasRT
Real time video processing, VTR emulation, 3D (Stereoscopic) Support and Dailies creation

RaveHD
A Linux-based SD and HD uncompressed video disk recorder.

Rave2K
A Linux-based SD, HD, Dual Link-HD and 2K Image, uncompressed video disk recorder.

DiceHD
A SD and HD, 6 channel video graphics overlay device.

Articles
Linux Devices

Credits
 The Spiderwick Chronicles
 Sin City
 Starship Troopers 2

References

External links
 SpectSoft website
 RaveHD

Software companies based in California
Entertainment companies based in California
Companies based in Stanislaus County, California
Oakdale, California
Software companies established in 1997
1997 establishments in California
Defunct software companies of the United States